Margaret 'Rita' McAllister (born 6 March 1946) is a Scottish musicologist, composer and academic. She is the Director of Music at the Royal Conservatoire of Scotland and is a renowned authority on the works of Sergei Prokofiev.

Biography 

McAllister was born on 6 March 1946 in Mossend, North Lanarkshire. She undertook her undergraduate studies at the University of Glasgow, graduating BMus with first class honours. At the same time she was a part-time student at the Royal Scottish Academy of Music and Drama studying piano with Wight Henderson and viola with Frieda Peters. She studied composition with Anthony Hedges and Robin Orr, and won the first BBC Scotland Young Composer’s prize in 1966. In the late 1960s she spent three years at the University of Cambridge researching the operas of Sergei Prokofiev; she completed her PhD in 1970.

Her work on Prokofiev resulted in intensive work in Moscow, Saint Petersburg and throughout the southern USSR. In the 1970s and 1980s she broadcast and published extensively on many aspects of Soviet and Russian music. Her compositions from this time include chamber works, song cycles and works for music theatre, as well as electro-acoustic pieces. From 1969 she was a lecturer in the Faculty of Music at the University of Edinburgh, teaching composition, 20th-century history and analysis, and established the electronic and recording studios there. She was appointed Director of Music at the Academy in 1986, and from 1996 to 2006 she was additionally Vice-Principal.

McAllister edited the original version of Prokofiev's War and Peace which was premiered in Glasgow on 22 January 2010.

References

Cohen, Aaron I. International encyclopedia of women composers : classical and serious music New York: R. R. Bowker, 1981.

1946 births
People from Bellshill
Academics of the University of Edinburgh
Alumni of the University of Cambridge
Alumni of the University of Glasgow
Scottish composers
Scottish musicologists
Living people
British women composers
Women musicologists
20th-century British composers
20th-century Scottish musicians
20th-century British musicologists
21st-century British composers
21st-century Scottish musicians
21st-century musicologists
Academics of the Royal Conservatoire of Scotland
Scottish women academics
20th-century women composers
21st-century women composers
20th-century Scottish women